The Lapua Movement was a radical Finnish nationalist, fascist, pro-German and anti-communist political movement founded in and named after the town of Lapua. Led by Vihtori Kosola, it turned towards far-right politics after its founding and was banned after a failed coup d'etat attempt in 1932. The movement's anti-communist activities continued in the parliamentarian Patriotic People's Movement.

Background 
The movement originated in November 1929, after a Finnish communist youth parade in the conservative and religious town of Lapua enraged pro-White locals, who subsequently attacked the parade physically. The momentum from this event was the catalyst for the formation of the Lapua Movement. It was initially dominated by anti-communist nationalists, emphasizing the legacy of the nationalist activism, the White Guards and the Civil War in Finland. The movement saw itself as the defender of what was won in the Civil War, supporting Lutheranism, Finnish nationalism, and anti-communism.

Many politicians and high-ranking military officers were initially sympathetic to the Lapua Movement, as anti-communism was the norm in the educated classes after the Civil War. However, excessive use of violence made the movement less popular within a few months.

During the Civil War, Ostrobothnia had been one of the most important strongholds of the White army, and anti-communist sentiments remained extremely strong. Late in November 1929, the Young Communist League of Finland arranged meetings and protests in Ostrobothnian Lapua. As the nationalists saw it, the communists had "mocked God, the Lutheran Church, the 'bourgeois' fatherland, the Finnish army and General Mannerheim". This infuriated many of the townspeople, who put a violent end to the meetings. Anti-communist violence was hailed as justified and  praiseworthy. On 1 December an anti-communist meeting was held, attracting more than 1,000 people demanding an end to all communist activities. The movement quickly spread around the country, and in some provinces people other than communists were targeted as well, for example the group "Patriotic Citizens of Viitasaari" wanted to purge Jews and Freemasons from the country.

Activities 

Marches and meetings were arranged throughout the country. On 16 June 1930 more than 3,000 men arrived in Oulu in order to destroy the printing press and office of the communist newspaper Pohjan Voima. The last issue of Pohjan Voima had appeared on 14 June. The same day, a communist printing press in Vaasa was destroyed. A so-called "Peasant March" to Helsinki was a major show of power. More than 12,000 men arrived in Helsinki on 7 July. The government yielded under the pressure, and communist newspapers were outlawed in a "Protection of the Republic Act."

Meetings held by leftist and labour groups were also interrupted, often violently. A common tactic was "muilutus", which started with kidnapping and beating. After that the subject was thrown into a car and driven to the border with the Soviet Union. Many of the Finns deported by the Lapua Movement were later caught up in Stalin's Great Purge and executed; while persecuted in Finland as communists, Stalin accused them of being "Nationalists". 

The Social Democratic politician Onni Happonen was kidnapped and murdered in September 1930. On 14 October 1930 the popular ex-president Kaarlo Juho Ståhlberg and his wife were kidnapped and taken to Joensuu. After this, general support for the movement collapsed. More moderate people left the movement, and extremists became more influential.

Failed rebellion 

In February 1932 a Social Democrat meeting in Mäntsälä was violently interrupted by armed Lapua activists. The event escalated to an attempted coup d'état known as the Mäntsälä rebellion (Mäntsälän kapina), led by the former Chief of Staff of Finland's army, General Wallenius. Despite the appeals of Wallenius, the army and the White Guards were largely loyal to the government. Many historians believe the main reason for the failure was poor planning: the event just escalated from actions of the local chapter and the national organization came aboard later. The rebellion ended after President Svinhufvud gave a radio speech to the rebels. After a trial, the Lapua Movement was banned on 21 November 1932 under the Protection of the Republic Act, which Lapua itself had worked to get passed. Wallenius and about 50 other leaders were sentenced to prison.

Legacy 

After the Lapua Movement was banned, the Patriotic People's Movement was formed shortly thereafter. Like its predecessor, it also was nationalist and anti-communist. It had limited political success and was banned in 1944 on the orders of the Soviet Union in the aftermath of the Continuation War.

See also 
 Continuation War
 Heimosodat
 History of Finland
 Minna Craucher
 Politics of Finland
 Vaps Movement (Estonia)
 Winter War

References

External links 
 

Finnish nationalism
Political history of Finland
Defunct political parties in Finland
Political parties established in 1929
Political parties disestablished in 1932
Movement
1929 establishments in Finland
1932 disestablishments in Finland
Fascism in Finland
Banned far-right parties
Anti-communist organisations in Finland